Afternoon Delight is a 2013 American comedy-drama film written and directed by Joey Soloway. It stars Kathryn Hahn, Juno Temple, Josh Radnor, and Jane Lynch.

Plot
Rachel (Kathryn Hahn) is a mother living in an unhappy life, frustrated by the roles of being a stay-at-home mom and not having had sex with her husband Jeff (Josh Radnor) for months. She visits her therapist, Lenore (Jane Lynch) but is unable to find any help in her advice.

Looking to spice up their relationship, Rachel and Stephanie go to a strip club, where Rachel sees McKenna (Juno Temple). Jeff buys her a private lap dance from McKenna; Rachel finds out that McKenna is only 19. But afterwards, Rachel and Jeff continue not having sex.

Rachel drives to the neighborhood of the strip club, hoping to see McKenna. At an espresso hut, she sees McKenna and they start talking. She introduces herself and they become friends, having coffee together regularly. One day, Rachel finds McKenna thrown out of her residence, and now homeless, so she invites her to stay at her large house. While Jeff is less than happy, Rachel does not feel that she can kick her out, as she feels she can help McKenna get out of being a stripper. She finds out that McKenna is a prostitute, who has clients she sees regularly.

Rachel starts teaching McKenna to nanny her young son Logan. When Rachel is frustrated at a school event, she asks McKenna if she can go with her to see her client, Jack. When there, she watches the two of them have sex, and is horrified by what she sees.

When asked by a friend if McKenna can babysit, Rachel changes her mind and says she doesn't want her to. McKenna is upset by this, as she went through a lot of effort buying things for the girls' party. While the women are out, and all the men are at Jeff and Rachel's house, McKenna comes in and starts acting provocatively. She ends up sleeping with one of Jeff's friends, but his wife and Rachel walk in on them. McKenna is thrown out of their house.

Rachel tells Jeff that she wants out of this life, and out of her head, which he takes to mean he should leave. At a visit to Lenore, Rachel comforts Lenore when she starts crying and telling her how her partner had left, saying "I don't want to start all over again." That night, Rachel goes to Jeff (he is staying in the garage of one of his friends) and they reconcile, being happier than ever.

One day while driving, Rachel sees McKenna on the street, and starts to stop but changes her mind. She tells her friend that she had nothing to say to her.

Rachel and Jeff are happy together again. The film ends with Rachel and Jeff having passionate sex while Rachel moans with orgasm.

Cast 
 Kathryn Hahn as Rachel
 Juno Temple as McKenna
 Josh Radnor as Jeff
 Jane Lynch as Lenore
 Jessica St. Clair as Stephanie
 Michaela Watkins as Jennie
 Josh Stamberg as Matt
 John Kapelos as Jack
 Keegan-Michael Key as Bo
 Annie Mumolo as Amanda

Release 
The film premiered at the 2013 Sundance Film Festival. The film was given a limited release on August 30, 2013.

Reception 
Afternoon Delight garnered mixed reviews. Review aggregator website Rotten Tomatoes gives the film a 67% approval rating based on 81 reviews, with an average rating of 6.17/10. The film's critics consensus reads: "Afternoon Delights uncertain tone is entertainingly offset by smart dialogue and standout starring work from Kathryn Hahn." On Metacritic, based on 21 critics, the film has a 48/100 rating, signifying "mixed or average reviews". Christy Lemire gave the film two stars.

Soloway received the Directing Award (United States, Drama) at the 2013 Sundance Film Festival on January 26, 2013.

Filmmaker Quentin Tarantino included Afternoon Delight on his list of the Top Ten Films of 2013.

Notes

References

External links 
 
 
 
 
 
 

2013 films
2013 comedy-drama films
2013 directorial debut films
2013 independent films
2010s English-language films
American comedy-drama films
American independent films
Films about prostitution in the United States
Films about striptease
Films set in Los Angeles
Films shot in Los Angeles
2010s American films